Three of a Kind is a British comedy sketch show starring comedians Tracey Ullman, Lenny Henry and David Copperfield. Three series were made by the BBC between 1981 and 1983.

The show bolstered the careers of Ullman and Henry, as well as being an outlet for young writers including Rob Grant and Doug Naylor, Ian Hislop and Nick Revell.

Ullman and Henry went on to greater success after the show, with Ullman initially launching a brief but successful pop career in 1983 before starring in the ITV sitcom Girls on Top in 1985 and then going on to a career on American television. Henry was given his own BBC series The Lenny Henry Show in 1984, which ran in various iterations until 2005, and has continued appearing on British television, or series produced in Britain (The Lord of the Rings: The Rings of Power as of 2022). While Copperfield continued to appear on television, including his own series Lift Off! with Coppers & Co!, he has had more success as a stand-up comedian in the years since Three of a Kind.

Commercial releases

Books
 A Three of a Kind book, featuring various sketches from the series, was published by the BBC in 1983.

Video and DVD

A single video of the show, entitled Three of a Kind and released under the "Best of British Comedy" banner, appeared in 1988 from 20th Century Fox. It contained the four episodes of the first series edited together into one programme without the musical guest performances.

The same video was released earlier in the UK in 1984 by BBC Video and re-released in 1998 under Paradox Videos. In 2005 and 2006, DVDs of each series were released in the United Kingdom by 2Entertain (BBC Worldwide).

Vinyl
 A comedy album was released in 1983.
 Tracey Ullman's 'Little Red Riding Hood' story-telling sketch from the series is sampled over an electro-boogie backing track on a Stiff Records 12-inch [BUY IT 217]. The record was pressed in 1984 and only exists as a white label test pressing. 'Little Red Riding Hood' was never released due to copyright issues. Some copies of this extremely rare 12-inch had 'One of a Kind' stamped on the sleeve, a reference to both Tracey Ullman and the name of the show.

See also
 A Kick Up the Eighties

References

External links 
 

BBC television sketch shows
1981 British television series debuts
1983 British television series endings
1980s British television sketch shows
English-language television shows